Philip Hermogenes Calderon  (Poitiers 3 May 1833 – 30 April 1898 London) was a British painter of French birth (mother) and Spanish (father) ancestry who initially worked in the Pre-Raphaelite style before moving towards historical genre. He was Keeper of the Royal Academy in London.

Life

Calderon was born in Poitiers, France. His father, the Reverend Juan Calderón (*  in Villafranca de los Caballeros; †  in London) was a professor of Spanish literature and a former Roman Catholic priest who had converted to Anglicanism. Calderon planned to study engineering, but he became so interested in drawing technical figures and diagrams that he changed his mind and devoted his time to art. In 1850, he trained at Leigh's art school, London, then went to Paris to study under François-Édouard Picot in 1851. His first successful painting was called By the waters of Babylon (1852), which was followed by a much more popular one called Broken Vows (1856). From the beginning he was inspired by the Pre-Raphaelites, and some of his work showed the detail, deep colors, and realistic forms that characterize the style. The artist Henry Stacy Marks was his friend and brother-in-law, and Calderon exhibited his portrait at the Royal Academy in 1872.

Calderon became a leading member of the St John's Wood Clique, a group of artists interested in modern genre and historical subjects who were inspired, both artistically and socially by the Pre-Raphaelites. Historical, biblical, and literary themes were common in Calderon's later work. Many of his pieces show women wearing rich, silky clothing in gently colored landscapes. His Morning (1884) features a copper-haired maiden watching a sunrise.

His Juliet (1888) shows Shakespeare's Juliet seated on her balcony gazing at the stars. His later paintings adopt a more classical style, comparable to Edward Poynter, which resulted from his close relationship with Frederic Leighton, then-President of the Royal Academy. Calderon became Keeper of the Royal Academy in 1887, and from then on worked to support the teaching of anatomy based on nude models at the Royal Academy Schools. His 1891 painting
St Elizabeth of Hungary's great act of renunciation was secured by the Chantrey bequest for the national collection, and is now located in Tate Britain, but caused considerable controversy because of its perceived anti-Catholic message. It depicted the saint bending nude over an altar watched by monks.

Works
By the waters of Babylon (1852; Tate, London)
 'Lord, Thy Will Be Done'  (1855; Yale Center for British Art, New Haven)
Broken vows ('More hearts are breaking in this world of ours, than one would say — Longfellow) (1856; Tate, London)
French peasants finding their stolen child (1859; Private collection)
The massacre of St. Bartholomew (1863; Private collection)
Margaret (1876; Manchester Art Gallery)
Morning (1884)
Juliet (1888)
St. Elizabeth of Hungary's great act of renunciation (1891; Tate, London)

Gallery

Further reading

Wilfrid Meynell, Volume 2 The modern school of art, volume 2 (London: W. R. Howell & Co., c. 1887), pp. 212–20.

References

External links

 
P. H. Calderon online (ArtCyclopedia)
Biography and paintings (Art Renewal Center Museum)
Calderon's work analysis
Calderon biography
Biography and paintings (Artmagick)
s:Calderon, Philip Hermogenes (DNB01)

1833 births
1898 deaths
French emigrants to England
English people of Spanish descent
19th-century English painters
English male painters
Keepers of the Royal Academy
19th-century painters of historical subjects
French people of Spanish descent
Burials at Kensal Green Cemetery
Artists' Rifles soldiers
People from Poitiers
Royal Academicians
19th-century English male artists